Jazirat Badiyah is an island or peninsula near Al Badiyah and Zubara in the Emirate of Fujairah, United Arab Emirates.

The terrain rises to 61 meters.

References

Geography of the Emirate of Fujairah
Islands of the United Arab Emirates
Peninsulas of the United Arab Emirates
Gulf of Oman